Choelquoit lake is an endorheic lake in the western Chilcotin District of the Central Interior of British Columbia, Canada, located north of Chilko Lake, west of Tatlayoko Lake, and east of Williams Lake. The lake is the largest high elevation lake in Canada without an outflow, and sits on the western edge of the Chilcotin plateau, surrounded by grasslands, pine forest, and views of the snow-capped Niut Mountains. 

There is a camp site on the east side of the lake.

The lake lies within the title land of the Tsilhqot'in First Nation. The traditional indigenous name for the lake is Naghatalhchuẑ.

References

Lakes of the Chilcotin
Lakes of British Columbia
Range 2 Coast Land District